Leander Watts is the pseudonym of American writer Th. Metzger. He is the author of five young adult novels. He graduated from the State University of New York at Geneseo and currently lives in the Burnt-Over District of New York State. 
Leander Watts was born and raised in Rochester, NY and has been called the Poet Laureate of the Burnt Over District of New York State.

Novels
Stonecutter
Wild Ride to Heaven
Ten Thousand Charms
Beautiful City of the Dead
Meet Me in the Strange

References

American children's writers
Living people
Year of birth missing (living people)
American male novelists